Reiner Dierksen (24 March 1908 – 15 May 1943) was a German U-boat commander in World War II and posthumous recipient of the German Cross in Gold.

Naval career
Reiner Dierksen joined the Reichsmarine in 1933. From October 1938 to June 1940 he was Commander M 5 of the 1st Mineseweeping flotilla, then he was the Commander of the 32nd Minesweeping flotilla until March 1941. Dierksen began his U-boat training in March 1941, then took his U-boat Commander training and U-boat familiarization until 15 December 1941 when he commissioned the Type IXC  at Bremen. On his second patrol with U-176 Dierksen ran into one of the most stubborn victims of the entire war when he spent almost 48 hours hunting the Dutch steam merchant, Polydorus, before finally sinking her with his 7th and 8th torpedoes.

Korvettenkapitän Reiner Dierksen died when his U-176 was sunk with all hands, 53 men, on its 3 war patrol north of Cuba on 15 May 1943 by Cuban patrol boat CS 13.

Death
On 15 May 1943, the Cuban merchant ship Camagüey, and the Honduran Hanks, both loaded with sugar, sailed from Sagua La Grande, bound for Havana, escorted by the Cuban submarine chasers CS-11, CS-12, and CS-13. CS-13 located the U-boat with her sonar, attacked with depth charges and sank U-176.

Summary of Career

Ships attacked

Awards
Iron Cross 2nd Class
Minesweeper War Badge
Iron Cross 1st Class
U-boat War Badge 1939
German Cross in Gold (posthumous)

References

Bibliography

1908 births
1943 deaths
U-boat commanders (Kriegsmarine)
Recipients of the Gold German Cross
Reichsmarine personnel
People lost at sea
Kriegsmarine personnel killed in World War II
Military personnel from Baden-Württemberg